Mad Dogs & Englishmen: The Complete Fillmore East Concerts is a live album by Joe Cocker, recorded in New York City in 1970.

The album Mad Dogs & Englishmen turned 35 years old in 2005. Commemorating this birthday was the release of the limited edition Mad Dogs & Englishmen: The Complete Fillmore East Concerts, documenting the entire four shows (on six discs) performed on Friday, March 27 and Saturday, March 28, 1970 at New York City's Fillmore East.

Track listing

Disc one
Friday March 27, 1970, early show:
"Honky Tonk Women"
"Let's Go Get Stoned"
"Sticks and Stones"
"Bird on a Wire"
"Cry Me a River"
"Superstar" performed by Rita Coolidge 
"Delta Lady"
"Something" 
"Feelin' Alright"
Blue medley:
"I'll Drown in My Own Tears"
"When Something Is Wrong with My Baby"
"I've Been Loving You Too Long"
"Space Captain"
"The Letter"
"Girl from The North Country" performed by Joe Cocker and Leon Russell

Disc Two
Friday March 27, 1970, late show:
"Honky Tonk Women"
"She Came In Through the Bathroom Window"
"Let's Go Get Stoned"
"Bird on a Wire"
"Cry Me a River"
"Superstar" performed by Rita Coolidge 
"Feelin' Alright"
"Something"
"Sticks and Stones"
Blue medley:
"I'll Drown in My Own Tears"
"When Something Is Wrong with My Baby"
"I've Been Loving You Too Long"

Disc Three
Friday March 27, 1970, late show, continued:
"Space Captain"
"Hummingbird" performed by Leon Russell
"Dixie Lullaby" performed by Leon Russell
"Delta Lady"
"The Letter"
"With a Little Help from My Friends"

Disc Four
Saturday March 28, 1970, early show:
"Honky Tonk Women"
"She Came In Through the Bathroom Window"
"Sticks and Stones"
"Bird on a Wire"
"Cry Me a River"
"Superstar" performed by Rita Coolidge 
"Feelin' Alright"
"Something"
"Space Captain"
"Let It Be" performed by Claudia Lennear 
"Delta Lady" 
"The Letter"
Blue medley:
"I'll Drown in My Own Tears"
"When Something Is Wrong with My Baby"
"I've Been Loving You Too Long"
"Give Peace a Chance"

Disc Five
Saturday March 28, 1970, late show:
"Honky Tonk Women"
"She Came In Through the Bathroom Window"
"The Weight"
"Cry Me a River"
"Further On Up the Road" Performed By Don Preston
"Darling Be Home Soon"
"Space Captain"
"Superstar" performed by Rita Coolidge 
"Delta Lady" 
"Let's Go Get Stoned"
"Sticks and Stones" 
"Let It Be" performed by Claudia Lennear

Disc Six
Saturday March 28, 1970, late show, continued:
"Feelin' Alright"
"Something"
"The Letter" 
"Give PeaceaA Chance"
Blue Medley:
"I'll Drown in My Own Tears"
"When Something Is Wrong with My Baby"
"I've Been Loving You Too Long"
"With a Little Help from My Friends"

Personnel 
Joe Cocker, Rita Coolidge, Donna Washburn, Claudia Lennear, Denny Cordell, Daniel Moore, Pamela Polland, Matthew Moore, Nicole Barclay, Bobby Jones - vocals
Leon Russell - lead guitar, piano, vocals, backing vocals
Don Preston - guitar, vocals, backing vocals
Chris Stainton - organ, piano
Carl Radle - bass guitar
Jim Gordon, Jim Keltner, Chuck Blackwell  - drums
Chuck Blackwell, Sandy Konikoff, Bobby Torres - percussion
Jim Horn, Bobby Keys - saxophone
Jim Price - trumpet

Technical
 Album cover photography: Jim McCrary
 Tour photographers: Andee Cohen, Linda Wolf

References

Joe Cocker live albums
Live at the Fillmore East albums
1970 live albums